David Merrill may refer to:

 David Nathan Merrill (born 1943), American diplomat
 M. David Merrill (born 1937), education researcher
David Merrill, guitarist and co-founder of Enders Game